Warren Goldstein may refer to:

Warren Goldstein (rabbi), Chief Rabbi, South Africa
Warren Goldstein (professor), History professor in the USA